Tomás Inciarte Rachetti (born 22 October 1996) is a Uruguayan rugby union player who plays as a centre or scrum half and represents Uruguay internationally. He was included in the Uruguayan squad for the 2019 Rugby World Cup which was held in Japan for the first time and also marked his first World Cup appearance.

Career 
As of 2019, Inciarte played his club rugby for Old Christians Club. He made his international debut for Uruguay against Brazil on 9 February 2018. He made his debut World Cup match appearance in Uruguay's opening game against Fiji on 25 September 2019 where Uruguay stunned Fiji 30-27 in Pool D clash.

References

External links

1996 births
Living people
Uruguayan rugby union players
Uruguay international rugby union players
Rugby union centres
Rugby union players from Montevideo
Peñarol Rugby players
Rugby union scrum-halves
People educated at Stella Maris College (Montevideo)